Sing the Folk Hits With Jack Narz is a studio album by radio and television personality Jack Narz and featuring the Mort Lindsey orchestra. It was released by Dot Records in 1959.

Track listing

References

1959 albums
Dot Records albums
Folk albums by American artists
World music albums by American artists
Country albums by American artists